Matthew Spain Airport , formerly called Central Farm Airstrip, is a public use airport serving San Ignacio, a town in the Cayo District of Belize.

Airline and destinations

See also

Transport in Belize
List of airports in Belize

References

External links 
OpenStreetMap - Matthew Spain Airport
OurAirports - Matthew Spain Airport
Aerodromes in Belize - pdf

Airports in Belize
Cayo District